Blue Monday Jamboree is an old-time radio variety program in the United States. It was broadcast initially (beginning January 24, 1927) on KFRC in San Francisco, California, then was distributed on the West Coast by the Don Lee Network and was later carried nationwide on CBS. Bill Oates wrote, in his biography of Meredith Willson, that the program was "one of the most popular West Coast originated radio shows in the early 1930s."

Format
Radio historian John Dunning wrote that the program was "known in the West as 'the daddy of all variety shows.'" Blue Monday Jamboree "contained music, comedy and a dramatic sketch (a detective story)."

A contemporary newspaper article (August 27, 1928, in the Oakland Tribune) described a typical broadcast as follows:Light entertainment will be the order of the evening on the bay city stations with frolics in evidence at many of the stations. Chief among these in point of seniority and general quality is the KFRC Blue Monday Jamboree which is attended by most of the entertainers appearing on the station throughout the week. These artists gather in an informal sort of meeting bandying jests and songs from 8 to 10 p.m.

Personnel 
The initial version of Blue Monday Jamboree in 1927 featured Juliette Dunne, Harvey Austin and the Hawaiians and Harry McClintock - Mac's Haywire Orchestra. The announcer was Harrison Holliway. Meredith Willson made his radio debut on the program in 1928. Al Pearce was one of the entertainers featured on the program.  Also, Bea Benaderet, Edna Fisher, and Ronald Graham. I Love Lucy creator Jess Oppenheimer earned his first-ever professional paycheck in 1934 for a comedy routine he wrote and performed on Blue Monday Jamboree. Oppenheimer writes extensively about the program in his memoir, Laughs, Luck...and Lucy, including this unforgettable story of KFRC General Manager Harrison Holliway's on-air interview with a railroad engineer:  He eventually starred in a spinoff program, Happy Go Lucky Hour, that began on KFRC, later moving to NBC and being renamed Al Pearce and His Gang. Other members of the troupe included Jane Green, Midge Williams, l , Elvia Allman, Harry McClintock, Edna Fisher, Tommy Harris, Tommy's Joynt, SF,
  
On the day of the program, at the afternoon rehearsal, Holliway was running through the interview with the engineer, who had just mentioned that the pattern of the train whistles was actually a code with which engineers communicated between themselves.

“What is the difference between the various whistles?” Holliway asked.

“They all mean different things,” the engineer replied, and went on to say that one long and two shorts mean one thing, two longs and two shorts mean another, three shorts have yet a different meaning, and so on.

“What is your favorite whistle?”

“That’s easy. It’s a private whistle; just between me and my wife. Long, short, long, short, long, long. I blow that when I’m about four miles out. My wife hears it and starts preparing dinner. She knows exactly how long it takes me to get home after I blow the whistle, and when I walk in the door a piping hot meal has just been set on the table.”

“Hold it. Hold it.”

Holliway was upset, stopping the rehearsal. “This is too sterile. We should be hearing these whistles,” he called to the director. “He should be blowing 
them for us.”

Holliway grew more and more excited by his new thought. He turned to the engineer. “You must actually blow them for us. How can we arrange that?”

The engineer offered that there usually were extra whistles in the shop being repaired. He suggested calling the railroad to see if they had one they could send to the studio. He did, and they had one; but they said it wouldn’t work unless the building had compressed air they could tie into. Holliway assured them there was plenty of air power. He was ecstatic, like a kid waiting for a new toy. They promised they’d get it there as fast as they could, and for the rest of the afternoon Holliway paced nervously up and down, tensely watching the street for the delivery truck.

No one bothered to ask the obvious question: If this fellow’s wife could hear the whistle when he blew it from four miles away, then when it was blown in a closed, window-walled room with several hundred folks sitting within 30 feet of it, wasn’t it going to be rather loud?

It took longer than anyone expected, and Holliway was nearly out of his mind when finally, at about six o’clock, a tremendous truck and trailer pulled up in front of the building. It was about half a block long, and it was carrying the whistle, which appeared to me at the time to be roughly as long as the Washington Monument, and as big around as the Stockton Street Tunnel. Everyone was shocked. Somehow, when a whistle like that is mounted on a huge railroad engine, everything is in proper proportion. But when put next to ordinary objects and people, it becomes awesome—almost unearthly.

Holliway, however, was delighted. A second, smaller truck, which followed the first, unloaded twenty or thirty laborers. Like Lilliputians trying to maneuver a trussed Gulliver, they managed to inch the whistle off the truck, snake it into the building, and worm it slowly up the stairs and into the studio. It was so heavy and bulky that airtime was approaching by the time they wrestled, tugged, and levered it into position. Its top cleared the ceiling by less than six inches.

The whistle cord was set so the engineer could reach up and pull it while he stood at the microphone. By the time the workmen finally tightened down the connection to the compressed air pipe, there was no time to test anything. The 
audience was already filling all those folding chairs, and in the background, through the windows that formed the entire wall, the heavy evening traffic on Van Ness Avenue was crawling by, unaware of this impending wedding of realism 
and technology.

The program took the air and everything went along fine, until it was time for the fateful interview. The railroad engineer and Holliway took their places. It was only a mildly interesting spot until Holliway asked him what the different whistles meant. He began to describe them, as per the original script, but Holliway stopped him and said, “But it’s silly to talk about them, when we can actually hear them with our own ears. The railroad has been good enough to send us this spare whistle. The first one, you said, was one long and 
two shorts?”

“That’s correct,” the engineer said, and while Holliway beamed at him with creative anticipation, he pulled the cord. The entire wall of windows shattered and blew out onto Van Ness Avenue. The performers on the stage were scattered like rag dolls. The audience, sitting in their folding chairs facing the stage, slid backwards across the floor as a unit, expressions of bemused interest still on their faces, riding their moving seats until they came to rest against the wall of now-glassless windows. The sound blew out the transmitter, and the station was off the air for two weeks. Mr. Lee, I understand, was hit with something like 58 suits for broken eardrums. It was one of the more memorable moments of early radio.

References

External links
Articles & Photo's
http://www.theradiohistorian.org/blue_mon_poster.jpg. KFRC 1927 Blue Monday Jamboree Photo
http://www.theradiohistorian.org/radio11.htm. KFRC's 1930's Blue Monday Jamboree Photo with names
http://www.theradiohistorian.org/pearce2.htm. KFRC Happy Go Lucky Hour Photo with names
https://bayarearadio.org/schneider/kfrc1.shtml Bay Area Radio Hall of fame, KFRC
Sheet music

1927 radio programme debuts
1935 radio programme endings
American variety radio programs
CBS Radio programs
Don Lee Network programs